For divisional competitions, see: 2008 Asian Five Nations division tournaments

The 2008 Asian Five Nations, known as the 2008 HSBC Asian 5 Nations due to its sponsorship by HSBC, was the inaugural series of the newly formatted Asian rugby union tournament, the Asian Five Nations. It is the flagship competition devised by the International Rugby Board to develop the sport in the Asian region. Ten matches were played over five weekends from 26 April to 24 May, with Japan winning all four of their games to become the first Asian Five Nations champions on 18 May 2008.

Scoring system: 5 points for a win, three for a draw, one bonus point for being within seven points of the winning team, and one for four tries.

Teams
The teams involved, with their world rankings pre tournament, were:

  (43)
  (30)
  (18)
  (33)
  (23)

Final table

Bottom team, Arabian Gulf, are relegated to Division One for 2009 edition.

Fixtures

Report on JRFU website

References

External links

Japan Rugby Football Union

Asian 5 nations  on itsrugby.co.uk

2008
Five Nations
Five Nations
Asia
2008 in Hong Kong sport
2008 in South Korean sport
2008 in Kazakhstani sport